The Air Force branch of the Royal Romanian forces in World War II was officially named the  (ARR), or the Romanian Royal Aeronautics, though it is more commonly referred to in English histories as the  (Royal Romanian Air Force, FARR), or simply  (Romanian Air Force). It provided support to land forces, carrying out reconnaissance and mounting air raids between other missions.

Insignia
The roundel of the ARR was based on the national cockade of Romania. During World War Two, from 1941 to 1944, the national cockade was reduced in size and placed in the center of a four-M cross, the seal of King Michael I of Romania. These crosses came in different types and sizes as there was no standard model. The markings were placed on the fuselage as well as on the upper and lower wings, and the national colours were painted on the tail. According to Axis regulations, the engine cowling, the under-surfaces of the wingtips and a vertical band on the fuselage ahead of the tail were painted in yellow. After Romania joined the Allies, the crosses were changed back to the tricolor roundels on the fuselage and wings, and the yellow markings were painted white as "Allied identification markings".

History
The ARR was first established on 1 January 1924 from the previous Romanian Air Corps.

During the Second World War, the ARR flew aircraft from Germany and Italy, with their own and other foreign aircraft, as well as captured enemy aircraft. The Royal Romanian Air Force fought against the Magyar Királyi Honvéd Légierö (Royal Hungarian Air Force) during the Hungarian annexation of Northern Transylvania in 1940. The most basic unit of their formations was the squadron. The Royal Romanian Air Force fought alongside the Luftwaffe during the advance into Ukraine and Crimea, until the Battle of Stalingrad, when the Southern Luftwaffe Command was installed in Bucharest. It also carried out some reconnaissance and patrol missions over the Black Sea alongside Bulgarian units. The ARR  was tasked with the air defence of the Ploiești oil installations, and also Bucharest against Allied air raids, and to protect Axis convoys in the Black Sea. These units fought against the USAAF and RAF during their raids against Romania.

The main models of aircraft used include the PZL P.24F, Hawker Hurricane, Heinkel He 112, Messerschmitt 109E and G types, Messerschmitt 110 (for night defence), IAR 80A were used too, alongside other types of interceptors used by the Luftwaffe units in area.

After King Michael's Coup, Romania turned against the Axis. The ARR, now allied with the Soviet Air Forces fought against German and Hungarian forces in Transylvania and Slovakia.

Romanian Air Aces

 Horia Agarici
 Mihai (Leu) Romanescu
 Constantin Cantacuzino
 Cristea Chirvăsuță
 Ioan Dicezare
 
 
 
 
 
 
 Alexandru Șerbănescu
 Dan Valentin Vizanty

Structure

Corpul 2° Aerian, Luftflotte 4, South Russia Front, Winter of 1943-44.
Corpul 1° Aerian, Cioara-Dolcesti, Romania August 1944; under orders of Luftwaffe, Luftflotte Kommando 4 with commands in Debrecen, Hungary.

Fighter units

1st Fighter Group
41st Fighter Squadron
42nd Fighter Squadron
2nd Fighter Group
45th Fighter Squadron
46th Fighter Squadron
5th Fighter Group
10th Fighter Squadron - 51st Fighter Squadron from October 1939
11th Fighter Squadron - 52nd Fighter Squadron from October 1939
6th Fighter Group
62nd Fighter Squadron
63rd Fighter Squadron
7th Fighter Group
53rd Fighter Squadron
57th Fighter Squadron
8th Fighter Group - from 1941 - 1943
59th Fighter Squadron
60th Fighter Squadron
9th Fighter Group
47th Fighter Squadron
48th Fighter Squadron
1st Night Fighter Squadron

Bomber units

1st Bomber Group
2nd Bomber Group
3rd Bomber/Dive Bomber Group
4th Bomber Group
5th Bomber Group
6th Bomber / Dive Bomber Group
8th Assault Group - formed from the 8th Fighter Group
41st Assault Squadron - ex-41st Fighter Squadron
42nd Assault Squadron - ex-42nd Fighter Squadron
60th Assault Squadron - ex-60th Fighter Squadron
18th Light Bomber Squadron

Reconnaissance Units

1st Long Range Recon Group
1st Long Range Recon Squadron
2nd Long Range Recon Squadron 
3rd Long Range Recon Squadron 
4th Long Range Recon Squadron 
1st Guard Group
2nd Guard Group

Transport Units
Air Transport Group
105th Transport Squadron
106th Transport Squadron
107th Transport Squadron
109th Glider Transport Squadron		
Liaison Units
111th, 112th, 113th, 115th, 116th Liaison Squadrons

Aircraft companies

 Arsenalul Aeronautic, 1919-1939, Bucharest
 Astra Aircraft Factory, 1923-1925, Arad
 Societatea Pentru Exploatări Tehnice (SET), 1923-1946, Bucharest
 Industria Aeronautică Română (IAR), 1925-1947 (re-established in 1968), Brașov
 Întreprinderea de Construcții Aeronautice Românești (ICAR), 1932-1951, Bucharest

Aircraft constructed under foreign license or assembled
 Messerschmitt Bf 109G (62 109Ga-6 converted from Ga-4 kits, 49 109Ga-2 and 13 109Ga-4 assembled by IAR between 1943 and 1948)
 SM.79B (36 IAR JRS-79B and 31 JRS-79B1 built by IAR)
 Fieseler Fi 156 Storch (80 ordered from ICAR)
 PZL P.24E (50 examples built by IAR)
 PZL P.11f (80 examples built by IAR)
 Potez 25 (built under license by IAR)

Enemy aircraft interned or captured

As a result of the Soviet Invasion of Poland, a large number of Polish Air Force aircraft were interned in Romania. Also, some Soviet aircraft were captured during World War II, as well as a few American B-24 Liberator bombers.

Aircraft of RRAF

Aircraft manufactured in Romania from 1924 until the end of World War II
All of the aircraft listed below were completed before the end of World War II. Prototypes are omitted from the list. Unless specified otherwise, all aircraft machine guns have the caliber of 7.92 mm:

Aircraft Markings

Notes

References

Bibliography

External links
Official site of the Romanian Air Force
 http://users.accesscomm.ca/magnusfamily/ww2rom.htm

Romanian Air Force
Military history of Romania during World War II